Dennis Jones is the name of:
Dennis Jones (Australian footballer) (1936–1999), Australian rules footballer
Dennis Jones (Australian politician) (1874–1936), Australian politician
Dennis Jones (footballer, born 1894) (1894–1961), English footballer
Dennis Jones (musician) (born 1958), American blues rock musician
Dennis Feltham Jones (1917–1981), British writer 
Dennis L. Jones (born 1941), American politician
Dennis M. Jones (1938–2016), American businessman

See also
Denis Jones (1906–1987), Irish politician